Cotana castaneorufa is a moth in the family Eupterotidae. It was described by Walter Rothschild in 1913. It is found in New Guinea.

The wingspan is about 49 mm. The forewings are chocolate liver brown with a tiny white dot at the base, an antemedian buff stigma followed by a buff transverse band which is distinct and broad at the costal half, growing narrower and indistinct on the inner half. There is a more or less indistinct postdiscal transverse greyish-olive outwardly curved chain of half moons. The hindwings are orange, the outer two-thirds almost completely suffused with liver brown. There is a brown transverse line in the basal one-third and an orange one somewhat sinuate in the outer one-third.

References

Moths described in 1913
Eupterotinae